Antonio Caballero Bravo (born 24 June 1967 in Guipúzcoa) is a retired boxer from Spain, who represented his native country at the 1988 Summer Olympics in Seoul, South Korea. There he was stopped in the second round of the light flyweight division (– 48 kg) by Vietnam's Dang Nieu Hu.

References
 Spanish Olympic Committee

1967 births
Living people
Flyweight boxers
Boxers at the 1988 Summer Olympics
Olympic boxers of Spain
Spanish male boxers
People from Gipuzkoa